Luciano Tajoli (17 April 1920 – 3 August 1996) was an Italian singer and actor.

Music festival
Luciano Tajoli participated several times (1961, 1962, 1963, and 1970) in the Sanremo Music Festival, winning in 1961 with the song Al di là. It is estimated that he sold over 45 million records.

Personal life 
Tajoli was born in Milan, came from a poor family and was a self-taught singer. He trained as an apprentice in tailor, barber and cobbler's shops. Due to polio in his childhood, Luciano always leaned during his performances, e.g., against a chair or piano. His limping was accommodated into the screenplays of his film appearances. He died, aged 76, in Merate.

Selected filmography
 The Taming of the Shrew (1942)
 Songs in the Streets (1950)
 Trieste mia! (1951)
 The Two Sergeants (1951)
 Don Lorenzo (1952)
 Il romanzo della mia vita (1952)
 La pattuglia dell'Amba Alagi (1953)
 Napoli piange e ride (1954)
 The Two Rivals (1960)
 Song of Naples (1957)

References

External links 
  Official Internet site

Singers from Milan
1920 births
1996 deaths
20th-century Italian male actors
20th-century Italian male singers
Sanremo Music Festival winners